Alan Jon Magill (November 26, 1953 – September 19, 2015) was the Director of Malaria Programs at the Bill & Melinda Gates Foundation and President of the American Society of Tropical Medicine and Hygiene.

Life and career 
Magill was born November 26, 1953 in Craig, Colorado. He graduated from Beaumont High School, Texas, and received his B.S. from Lamar University in 1976, his M.S. from the University of Rhode Island in 1978, and his M.D. from Baylor College of Medicine in 1984.

He held the Head of Parasitology position at the United States Navy's Medical Research Center in Peru from 1996–1999.

Magill worked as Program Manager at the Defense Advanced Research Projects Agency (DARPA) from 2009-2012 before joining the Bill & Melinda Gates Foundation in 2012, where he worked until his death in 2015. During his tenure at the Foundation, he worked to address health issues including malaria and Ebola.

References 

1953 births
2015 deaths
Baylor College of Medicine alumni
Bill & Melinda Gates Foundation people
Lamar University alumni
University of Rhode Island alumni
People from Moffat County, Colorado
Presidents of the American Society of Tropical Medicine and Hygiene